Adolf Maximilian Fehr (April 7, 1904 – 1992) was a Swiss field hockey player who competed in the 1928 Summer Olympics and in the 1936 Summer Olympics.

In 1928 he was part of the Swiss team which was eliminated in the group stage of the Olympic tournament. He played all four matches as halfback or forward.

Eight years later he was a member of the Swiss team which was eliminated in the group stage of the 1936 Olympic tournament. He played all three matches as halfback or forward.

External links
 
profile

1904 births
Year of death missing
Swiss male field hockey players
Olympic field hockey players of Switzerland
Field hockey players at the 1928 Summer Olympics
Field hockey players at the 1936 Summer Olympics

de:Adolf Fehr